The Răchitiș is a left tributary of the river Tazlău in Romania. It discharges into the Tazlău in Sănduleni.

References

Rivers of Romania
Rivers of Bacău County